Opsitycha squalidella is a moth of the family Oecophoridae. It was described by Edward Meyrick in 1884 and originally named Philobota squalidella. In 2018 the species Borkhausenia morella was synonymised with this species.

References

Moths described in 1884
Oecophoridae
Moths of New Zealand
Moths of Australia
Taxa named by Edward Meyrick